is a Japanese dark fantasy manga series written by Takaya Kagami and illustrated by Yamato Yamamoto with storyboards by Daisuke Furuya. The series is set in a world that allegedly comes to an end at the hands of a "human-made" virus, ravaging the global populace and leaving only children under the age of thirteen untouched. It is at this time that vampires emerge from the recesses of the earth, likely followed by age-old horrors of the dark thought only to be myth. A young man named Yūichirō Hyakuya joins a vampire extermination unit to avenge the deaths of his orphaned family and reclaim his childhood best friend Mikaela from the vampires. It started publishing in Shueisha's Jump SQ in September 2012.

An anime adaptation by Wit Studio was broadcast in two cours. The first cour aired from April to June 2015. The second cour aired from October to December 2015. A series of light novels focused on Yu's superior, Guren Ichinose, has been written by Kagami and illustrated by Yamamoto. In North America, Viz Media licensed the series for an English language release, and it ran in Weekly Shonen Jump. The anime series was licensed by Funimation. It was later broadcast in the United Kingdom on Viceland in February 2018.

Plot

In 2012, the world allegedly comes to an end at the hands of a "man-made" virus, ravaging the global populace and leaving only children under the age of thirteen untouched. At the same time, the vampires emerge from the recesses of the earth, likely followed by age-old horrors of the dark thought only to be myth. They sweep the earth and claim it in a single violent stroke, subjugating the remnants of humanity and leading them beneath the surface to safety. This "protection" comes at the price of "donating" blood to their captors, not knowing that they are vampires. At the age of twelve, Yūichirō and his friend and fellow orphan Mikaela plotted to escape along with the children in Hyakuya Orphanage. However, this resulted in their deaths and Mikaela sacrifices himself in order for Yūichirō to escape and be saved by members of the Moon Demon Company, an extermination unit of the Japanese Imperial Demon Army. Four years later, Yūichirō dedicates his life to destroy vampires and seek revenge against them for killing his "family." At the same time, it is revealed that Mikaela survived and plans to find Yūichirō.

Media

Manga

Seraph of the End is written by Takaya Kagami and illustrated by Yamato Yamamoto. It has been serialized by Shueisha's monthly magazine Jump Square since September 4, 2012. A voice comic (vomic) was also produced and published by Shueisha, and its first episode was featured by Sakiyomi Jum-Bang! on February 1, 2013. Shueisha has compiled its chapters into individual tankōbon volumes. The first volume was released on January 4, 2013. As of February 3, 2023, twenty-nine volumes have been published. The manga is licensed in North America by Viz Media, who added it to its Weekly Shonen Jump digital magazine lineup.

A spin-off gag manga to commemorate the anime adaptation, titled , was serialized in the 17th and 18th issues of Jump SQ.19 from December 19, 2014, to February 19, 2015, and later serialized in Jump Square from April 4 to December 4, 2015. It also has been published on the Seraph of the End official website.

A manga adapting the Guren Ichinose light novel series was serialized in Kodansha's Monthly Shōnen Magazine from June 6, 2017 to February 4, 2022. It will end in its twelfth volume, which will be released on March 4, 2022. At Anime Expo 2022, Kodansha USA announced that they licensed the series for English publication.

Light novels
 is a prequel focusing on Guren Ichinose as the main protagonist, detailing the series of events that occurred eight years before the start of the manga. Written by Takaya Kagami and illustrated by Yamato Yamamoto, it consists of seven volumes and was published by Kodansha from January 2013 to December 2016. On February 15, 2015, Vertical announced that it has licensed the light novels for a North American release and will be releasing it in an omnibus with two volumes per omnibus in January 2016. The novels have also been translated into other languages, such as German and French by Kazé. A drama CD was released on October 30, 2015, bundled with volume 6 of the light novel and is written by Takaya Kagami.

A new light novel series about Mikaela's story and the origin of vampires titled  began publication by Shueisha on December 4, 2015. The story is written by Takaya Kagami and illustrated by Yamato Yamamoto.

On October 20, 2017, it was announced on Kodansha's light novel blog that a second spin-off series about Guren, titled  would be released in December. It is written by Takaya Kagami and illustrated by Yo Asami. On March 11, 2019, Vertical announced that it has licensed the novels for a northern American release, saluted for December 2019.

Anime

An anime adaptation was announced on August 28, 2014, and aired on April 4, 2015. The series has 24 episodes. It is produced by Wit Studio, directed by Daisuke Tokudo, and written by Hiroshi Seko. Additionally, the original manga's writer, Takaya Kagami, personally drafted the original story for episodes with material not yet serialized in the manga and supervised the scripts until the anime's final episode. On December 12, 2014, it was announced the series would be split into two parts (quarters of the year). The first half (12 episodes) aired in 2015 from April to June and the second half (12 episodes) from October to December. The series premiered on Tokyo MX, MBS, TV Aichi, and BS11 at their respective time slots. NBCUniversal Entertainment Japan released the first 12 episodes on Blu-ray and DVD formats in Japan starting on June 24, 2015, across four volumes. A six-minute omake anime special adapted from the omake featured in the original manga, was included in each Blu-ray/DVD volume titled .

On March 31, 2015, it was announced that Funimation has licensed the series for streaming and its home video release in North America. Hulu also streamed the series. On May 13, Funimation announced that the English broadcast dub will stream every Wednesday at 8:30 p.m. EDT on its "Dubble Talk" streaming block. In the United Kingdom, the English dub was broadcast on Viceland, beginning February 15, 2018.

An OAD bundled with volume 11 of the original manga titled  was released on May 2, 2016. It was first screened at the Jump Special Anime Festa 2015 event in November 2015.

Hiroyuki Sawano produced and co-composed the music, as well as the opening and ending themes, "X.U." and "scaPEGoat", respectively, with Takafumi Wada, Asami Tachibana, and Megumi Shiraishi. As part of Sawano's vocal song project "SawanoHiroyuki[nZk]", for the first 12 episodes, the opening song is performed by SawanoHiroyuki[nZk]:Gemie, while the ending song is performed by SawanoHiroyuki[nZk]:Yosh. Both themes were released in Japan on a CD on May 20, 2015.

Video games
A PlayStation Vita strategy game, titled , was released by Bandai Namco Entertainment and Activision on December 17, 2015.

BNEI also released a smartphone game titled  on September 28, 2015.

Reception
The manga was nominated for the 40th Kodansha Manga Award for shōnen category in 2016.

Rebecca Silverman of Anime News Network gave volume 1 an overall grade of B+.

Sales
Volume 1 reached the 24th place on the Japanese weekly manga chart, and, as of 13 January 2013, has sold 62,434 copies. It also reached the 3rd place on the New York Times manga bestseller chart. Volume 2 reached the 15th place on the weekly manga chart, and, as of 12 May 2013, has sold 91,095 copies. Volume 3 reached the 9th place and, as of September 15, 2013, has sold 121,235 copies. Volume 4 also reached the 9th place on the chart, and, as of January 19, 2014, has sold 160,444 copies. Volume 5 also reached the 9th place, and has sold, as of May 11, 2014, 155,139 copies. In 2015, the manga sold 2.8 million copies. As of May 2017, the manga had 7 million copies in print, and as of April 4, 2018, the manga had 8.5 million copies in print. In March 2019, the manga had 9 million copies in print. On August 15, 2019, the manga had 10 million copies in print. As of June 4, 2021, the manga has 12 million copies in print. As of October 2021, the manga has 13 million copies in print.

The Guren Ichinose: Catastrophe at Sixteen light novels reached 21st place as one of the Top-Selling light novels in Japan, with 128,690 copies sold in May 2015, and it additionally reached 29th place in 2016, with 100,077 more copies sold. The Story of Vampire Mikaela novels also reached 21st place, having sold 127,373 copies in May 2016. Its manga adaptation second volume reached 25th place on the Japanese's weekly manga chart, with 30,147 copies in print.

References

External links
Official website 
Official manga website 
Official anime website 

2012 manga
2013 Japanese novels
2015 anime television series debuts
2015 Japanese novels
Anime composed by Hiroyuki Sawano
Dark fantasy anime and manga
Funimation
Kodansha books
Kodansha manga
Light novels
NBCUniversal Entertainment Japan
PlayStation Vita games
PlayStation Vita-only games
Post-apocalyptic anime and manga
Production I.G
Anime and manga about revenge
Shōnen manga
Shueisha franchises
Shueisha manga
Vampires in anime and manga
Vertical (publisher) titles
Viz Media manga
Wit Studio